The Renault Alpine GTA and the succeeding A610 is a sports coupe automobile produced by the Renault-owned French manufacturer Alpine between late 1984 and 1995. It replaced the slow-selling Alpine A310, with which it shared many features, including the layout and engine. The GTA was replaced by the A610 in 1991.

Alpine GTA

The Grand Tourisme Alpine (or GTA) is a sporty automobile model produced by the French manufacturer Alpine, launched in 1985. It is the successor to the Alpine A310, and the first Alpine produced 100% by Renault.

It was the first car launched by Alpine under Renault ownership (though Alpine had been affiliated with Renault for many years, with its earlier models using many Renault parts). Longer, wider, and taller, it effectively updated the design of its predecessor, the Alpine A310, updating that car's silhouette with modern design features like body-integrated bumpers and a triangular C-pillar with the large rear windshield. Like its predecessor, it used the V6 PRV engine in a rear-engined layout, with extensive use of Polyester plastics and fibreglass for the body panels making it lighter and quicker than rivals such as the Porsche 944. Passenger room increased, making the rear seat more useful, while equipment was much more complete and now included items such as power locks. It was one of the most aerodynamic cars of its time, and the naturally aspirated version achieved a record 0.28 drag coefficient in its class. Due to its bigger tires and need for more cooling intakes, the Turbo's drag coefficient was a bit higher: 0.30 . The GTA name, used to denote the entire range of this generation, stands for "Grand Tourisme Alpine," but in most markets, the car was marketed as the Renault Alpine V6 GT or as the Renault Alpine V6 Turbo. In Great Britain, it was sold simply as the Renault GTA, as Sunbeam (and then Chrysler/Talbot) had been using the "Alpine" badge since the 1950s.

Rather than being molded in a single piece as for the preceding A310, the new Alpine's body was molded in a large number of small separate panels. This required a significant overhaul of the Alpine plant, leaving only the sandblasting machinery intact. The car was also considerably more efficient to manufacture, with the time necessary to build a finished car dropping from 130 to 77 hours - which was still a long time but acceptable for a small-volume specialty car. The PRV engine in the naturally aspirated model was identical to the version used in the Renault 25, a 2849 cc unit producing . Also available was the more powerful turbocharged model, which used a smaller (2.5-liter) displacement.

The central backbone chassis (with outriggers for side impact protection) was built by Heuliez and then transferred to Dieppe. Aside from the body, most of the car was subcontracted to various suppliers. The drivetrain was mounted on a separate subframe, meaning it can be removed in as little as two hours. It was also moved  forward (making the rear overhang shorter while nearly all other dimensions increased) compared to the A310, improving somewhat on that car's tailwards weight distribution. The transmission was the same Renault 30-based unit that the A310 had used, with some minor changes and somewhat longer fourth and fifth gears. Those gears were taller than for the GT Turbo model. At the time of introduction, the daily production number amounted to ten cars. This soon dropped considerably, as the somewhat less than prestigious Renault had a hard time in the sports car marketplace. The average production for the six full years was just above 1000 per annum, or just above three per day - almost identical to the A310 V6's annual production.

Models

Alpine wanted to launch a complete range of models. Three models were announced for public use.

V6 GT 

Presented in November 1984, it is the base version. With a Cx of 0.28, and an SC of 0.48, the V6 GT set a record for aerodynamics at the time for a car in this category.

The first model introduced was the naturally aspirated V6 GT (D 500), which entered production in November 1984, although press photos had been released in September 1984. The car was first shown at the 1985 Amsterdam Rai, immediately after which it also went on sale.

Europa Cup model
The Europa Cup was initially rolled out in July 1985. The model was conceived for racing during the Formula 1 Grand Prix in Europe, hence its name. Of the 69 cars manufactured between 1984 and 1987, it is estimated that only seven remain in the "civilian" version. All cars left the production lines of the Alpine factory in Dieppe with their registration certificate, but to recover the VAT, some Europa Cups no longer carry the proper paperwork for registration.

In July 1985, the Europa Cup model appeared; this limited edition model was intended for a single-make racing championship, and 69 cars were built (54 in 1985 and 15 more in 1987).

V6 Turbo 
It was introduced in September 1985. With a larger rear spoiler grille to improve cooling. The Cx increases from 0.28 to 0.30. Like the Renault 25 V6 Turbo, the GTA benefits from the 2.458 cc V6 PRV turbocharged engine.

Sales of the naturally aspirated model were always sluggish, but with the more powerful turbo, things picked up considerably. At the 1986 Birmingham Show, the right-hand-drive version was presented and UK sales, as the Renault GTA, commenced.

In early 1987 a catalyzed version appeared, with fifteen fewer horsepower. This meant that the Turbo could finally be sold in Switzerland and later in other European countries such as Germany and the Netherlands when they adopted stricter legislation. The catalyzed model had lower gearing in the fourth and fifth gears to mask its power deficit. In 1988 anti-lock brakes became available. For the 1989 model year the Mille Miles version appeared. With the non-catalyzed engine, this model heralded a re-focus on the Alpine name. The Renault logo was gone from the car, with an alpine logo up front and a large "Alpine" print appearing between the taillights. However, as the name 'Alpine' could not be used in the UK the name Alpine was removed from cars destined for the UK; there was no large print at the back of these cars and a UK specific logo was fitted to the front of the car. The Mille Miles, a limited edition of 100 cars, also featured a special dark red metallic paintjob, polished aluminium wheels, and a large silver-gray triangular stripe with the Alpine "A" across the left side of the front.

In February 1990 the limited edition Le Mans arrived, this car had a more aggressive body kit with polyester wheel arch extensions and a one piece front with smaller headlights. Wheels were 3 piece BBS style produced by ACT, 8x16" front & 10x17" rear. Many of these changes were adopted for the succeeding A610. The regular V6 GT and V6 Turbo ended production during 1990, while the Le Mans version continued to be produced until February 1991. 325 of these were built in total. Also in 1990, Renault was forced to install the less powerful catalyzed engine in cars destined for the home market, leading to grumbling amongst Alpine enthusiasts about the loss of power (down to ) while the 25 Turbo saloon actually gained power when it became catalyzed.

GTA USA 

Renault and Alpine quickly considered exporting the GTA to the United States through the American Motors Corporation subsidiary. A model derived from the V6 Turbo was therefore designed and finalized to adapt to local constraints. In compliance with North American regulations, it lost its front lights under the canopy in favor of retractable optics, its bumpers were more protruding and deformable, and side lights were inserted into the bumpers and integrated into adhesive protections. The front bumper grille was widened to improve cooling. The front turn signals were orange. A third brake light was inserted under the rear spoiler. The GTA USA benefited from a major redesign of the chassis. The tubes of the front structure were replaced by pressed sheet metal. Energy dampers for the shields were added. The sides were reinforced with bars in the doors and doubled side reinforcements. Many of the developments made for the GTA USA chassis were reused on the A610.

Renault had planned a federalized version of the Alpine V6 Turbo, originally for the 1986 model year, but development proceeded slowly. Various crash safety improvements were also carried out, and it was planned to install softer suspension. AMC/Renault was planning a mid-1987 introduction, hoping to sell 3,000 Alpines per year (with an additional 300 cars slated for Canada). In March 1987, however, Renault sold its share in American Motors to Chrysler and began to withdraw from the American and Canadian markets. Commentators had already expressed concern about AMC dealers being able to handle such an expensive and complicated car. By the time of the withdrawal, 21 pre-series cars had been finished. Twelve of these were sold by Alpine directly to specially selected customers in France.

Limited editions

Le Mans 

The Le Mans is released in February 1990. It is planned to build 300 units. 325 will be built until February 1991. It adopts the catalyzed evolution of the V6 Turbo, and its power drops from 200 to 185 hp. It is equipped with a body kit derived from the one proposed by a German tuner. The fenders are widened, and the front turn signals migrate from the fender tips to the bumper. The fenders and front mask are formed in one piece and rocker panels are added. It has specific ACT wheels "BBS style" with a false central nut. Only three colors are offered: Alpine Blue (No. 488), Imperial Red (No. 570) and Beetle Green (No. 592). This body kit will give the outline of its successor, the A610.

In 1990, Alpine is obliged by French regulations to clean up its engines. Contrary to the Renault 25 V6 Turbo which sees its power going from 182 to 205 hp, the V6 Turbo of the GTA goes from 200 to 185 hp. Alpine fans cry treason when they see this difference in treatment between the two cars. However, the V6 PRV of the Alpine is not strictly identical to that of the Renault 25 since it had to be adapted, in particular for the implementation of the gearbox. With a totally different engine environment, the engineers cannot optimize the GTA's pollution control at a reasonable cost without reducing power. The sales volumes of the Alpine do not allow such investments.

With the help of the Danielson SA company, the after-sales service nevertheless develops a simple and inexpensive engine preparation intended to calm the discontented. The engine management is optimized and the power increases from 185 to 210 hp. The registration was modified accordingly. The Danielson "Le Mans" has almost the same performance as the non-catalyzed V6 Turbo. This preparation cost at the time 16 000 FRF in addition to the 375 000 FRF of the basic car.

Specifications

Alpine A610 

The successor to the Alpine GTA, the Alpine A610 was produced by the Renault-owned French manufacturer Alpine from 1991 to 1995. Due to a limited budget at the beginning of the project, its appearance does not differ much from the GTA, and it looks quite similar to the USA GTA with its pop-up headlights. Nonetheless, it is a completely different car, sharing only the windows with the GTA. The basic concepts of all Alpine cars are there (e.g. the rear engine, and the steel backbone chassis that all Alpines since the A110 have had). The car was solely branded as an Alpine, as linking Alpine and Renault together (first as Alpine-Renault then Renault-Alpine) seemed to detract from the Alpine brand's sporty image.

The A610 Albertville 92 was presented in 1991 for the Olympic Games. Two examples, and other Renault cars, were used to drive VIPs, before being sold. They had a specific color (Gardenia White) and interior, but used the standard engine and technical specifications.

The A610 Magny-Cours was created for the Williams-Renault Formula One victory in the French Grand Prix at Magny-Cours in July 1991. 31 cars were built, with specific color and interior. They carry a "Magny-Cours" legend on the doors and have body-colored rims.

The A610 did not result in an improvement in sales over the commercially disappointing GTA and the car was discontinued in 1995, despite acclaim from the motoring press, and approval from the British car show Top Gear. The A610 was to be the last car to carry the Alpine name until the 2017 release of the new Alpine A110. After production of the A610 ended, the Alpine factory in Dieppe produced the Renault Spider. 818 were built, 67 of which were right-hand-drive. Sales the first two years were acceptable, but from 1993 until production ended in 1995 a mere 80 cars were built.

In Jeremy Clarkson's 2007 direct to DVD film ‘Supercar Showdown’, the production infamously destroyed a particularly rare right-hand-drive example of the A610, by driving it into a concrete K-rail.

Specifications

References

External links 

Alpine A610 GTA
Sports cars
Rear-wheel-drive vehicles
1990s cars
Cars introduced in 1984
Automobiles with backbone chassis
Rear-engined vehicles
Cars discontinued in 1995